Under the Same Sky is a 1964 Yugoslavian film directed by Ljubisha Georgievski.

Under the Same Sky may also refer to:
 "Under the Same Sky", a song on the CD version of the single Love Paradox by American singer Leah Dizon
 Under the Same Sky, a TV series of children's stories from around the world, broadcast by CITV from 1984–1987

See also
The Same Sky (disambiguation)